Craig Lewis may refer to:

Craig Lewis (baseball) (born 1976), Australian baseball player
Craig Lewis (cricketer), Irish cricketer
Craig Lewis (cyclist) (born 1985), American professional road bicycle racer
H. Craig Lewis (1944–2013), Pennsylvania State Senator

See also
Lewis Craig (1569–1622), Scottish judge